The Grammy Award for Best Chamber Music Performance was awarded from 1959 to 2011. The award was discontinued in 2012 in a major overhaul of Grammy categories; since 2012, recordings in this category have fallen under the Best Small Ensemble Performance category. The award has had several minor name changes:

From 1959 to 1960 the award was known as Best Classical Performance - Chamber Music (including chamber orchestra)  
In 1961 it was awarded as Best Classical Performance - Vocal or Instrumental - Chamber Music
From 1962 to 1964 it was awarded as Best Classical Performance - Chamber Music
In 1965 it was awarded as two awards for Best Chamber Music Performance - Vocal and Best Chamber Music Performance - Instrumental
From 1966 to 1967 it was awarded as Best Classical Chamber Music Performance - Instrumental or Vocal
From 1968 to 1990 it was awarded as Best Chamber Music Performance
In 1991 it was awarded as Best Chamber Music or Other Small Ensemble Performance
From 1992 to 2011 it has been awarded as Best Chamber Music Performance

Years reflect the year in which the Grammy Awards were presented, for works released in the previous year.

Recipients

References

Grammy Awards for classical music